St. Joseph Parish is a parish designated for Polish immigrants in Suffield, Connecticut, United States. It was founded on March 12, 1916. It is one of the Polish-American Roman Catholic parishes in New England in the Archdiocese of Hartford.

History 
On March 12, 1916, Bishop John Joseph Nilan appointed Fr. Francis Wladasz as founding pastor of the newly created St. Joseph Parish. The new pastor celebrated the first parochial Mass on Easter Sunday of 1916 in the Edwin D. Morgan stable, purchased earlier by the St. Joseph Society and  converted into a church.

On November 9, 1952,  Bishop Henry J. O'Brien dedicated modern St. Joseph Church with a Georgian style brick edifice.

Bibliography 
 
 The Official Catholic Directory in USA

External links 
 St. Joseph - Diocesan information
 St. Joseph - ParishesOnline.com
 Archdiocese of Hartford

Roman Catholic parishes of Archdiocese of Hartford
Polish-American Roman Catholic parishes in Connecticut
Suffield, Connecticut
Churches in Hartford County, Connecticut
Christian organizations established in 1916
Roman Catholic churches completed in 1962